Middelkamp is a surname. Notable people with the surname include:

George H. Middelkamp (1880–1966), American politician
Theo Middelkamp (1914–2005), Dutch cyclist